Rose-Eliandre Bellemare (born 20 August 1989) is a French artistic gymnast and a member of the French National Team. She participated in the 2008 Summer Olympics.

Bellemare joined the French Junior Team at age 12. She competed at the junior European championships in 2004, and the senior competition in 2006.

After a hiatus of one year due to injury, she made a comeback and qualified for the 2008 Olympic Games as a replacement. She replaced Cassy Vericel on the team. Bellemare participated in the Olympic competition on three apparatuses and helped the French team to finish in 7th place overall for this event.

Personal life
She is the sister of professional ice hockey player Pierre-Édouard Bellemare.

References

1989 births
Living people
Sportspeople from Montpellier
French female artistic gymnasts
Gymnasts at the 2008 Summer Olympics
Olympic gymnasts of France
French people of Martiniquais descent
Mediterranean Games gold medalists for France
Mediterranean Games silver medalists for France
Competitors at the 2005 Mediterranean Games
Competitors at the 2009 Mediterranean Games
Mediterranean Games medalists in gymnastics